Transparency (known as Takedown in Europe) is a 2010 action film written and directed by Raul Inglis.
It won Inglis the Best Director title at the 2011 Leo awards.

Plot
The film focuses on a man who failed to save his daughter from a vicious attack. He works as a security guard, uncovering more than he bargained for and finding himself in the dark world of human trafficking.

Cast
Lou Diamond Phillips as David
Estella Warren as Monika
Deborah Kara Unger as Danielle
Aaron Pearl as Reg
Jordana Largy as Sam
Kendall Cross as Billie
Michael Kopsa as Dale
Dariya Parakhnevych as Vika
Vitaly Kravchenko as Pavel
Emma Lahana as Alex

References

External links

2010 films
English-language Canadian films
Canadian crime drama films
Films shot in Vancouver
2010s crime drama films
2010 drama films
2010s English-language films
2010s Canadian films